Rachel Mironovna Khin (9 March 1861 – 12 December 1928) was a Russian Jewish author, playwright, and salonnière.

She was born in Gorki, Mogilev Governorate to Miron and Rebecca Khin. She was educated at the Women's Third Gymnasium in Moscow, studied medicine at Saint Petersburg, and history and literature at the Collège de France in Paris. Khin's novels and sketches first appeared in the Vyestnik Yevropy, Russkaga Mysl, Nedyelya, and Voskhod, and were later issued in book form under the titles Siluety (Moscow, 1894) and Pod Goru (ib. 1900).

References
 

1861 births 
1928 deaths
Salon holders from the Russian Empire
Women dramatists and playwrights
Dramatists and playwrights from the Russian Empire
Jewish writers from the Russian Empire
Jewish women writers